The Cayenne nightjar (Setopagis maculosa) is a species of bird in the nightjar family only known from a single specimen, a male taken on the Fleuve Mana, French Guiana, in 1917. However, a possible female was caught at the Saül airstrip, French Guiana, in 1982.

Taxonomy and systematics

The Cayenne nightjar was originally described in 1920 as Nyctipolus maculosus and was later lumped into genus Caprimulgus. Some authors contended that it is not a species, but a subspecies of blackish nightjar (Nyctipolus nigrescens). By the early 2000s it was generally recognized as a species and has been placed in its current genus Setopagis since the early 2010s. Nevertheless, the South American Classification Committee of the American Ornithological Society (AOS) states, " Its placement in Setopagis is entirely tentative", and the Cornell Lab of Ornithology's Birds of the World agrees.

Description

The Cayenne nightjar is known in certainty only from the holotype, a male. The upperparts are grayish-brown with cinnamon spots and broad blackish brown streaks. The face is mostly chestnut. The hindneck has a narrow, indistinct tawny collar with brown bars. The wing coverts are grayish brown, heavily spotted with buff and cinnamon; the scapulars are blackish brown, broadly edged with buff. The tail is brown with a few small white spots and is otherwise mottled with grayish brown and barred with blackish brown. The chin, throat, and upper breast are buff with a chestnut tinge and brown bars. The belly and flanks are buff with brown bars. The individual captured in 1982 differed in minor ways and could have been either a female or an immature male. It was not photographed so there is no permanent record of its appearance.

Distribution and habitat

The only positively identified Cayenne nightjar was collected at Tamanoir, French Guiana, in 1917. All of the records of Cayenne nightjar (positive and possible) are from humid lowland forest. Blackish nightjar specimens have been collected at the same site as the 2017 holotype; it is strongly associated with rock outcroppings but it is unknown if the Cayenne nightjar shares that habitat preference.

Biology

Nothing is known about the Cayenne nightjar's biology. Its feeding, breeding, and other behaviors are assumed to be similar to those of other nightjars.

Status

The IUCN has assessed the Cayenne nightjar as Data Deficient. "Nevertheless, potentially suitable habitat remains, and there is no reason why the species may not still be extant."

References

Further reading

Setopagis
Birds of the Guianas
Birds described in 1920
Taxa named by W. E. Clyde Todd
Species known from a single specimen